Kpah Sherman (born 3 February 1992) is a Liberian professional footballer who plays as a forward for Malaysia Super League side Sri Pahang. Besides Malaysia, he has played in his native Liberia, Northern Cyprus, Tanzania, and South Africa.

Career
Sherman's football career began with his local team Aries FC in Liberia before moving to Barrolle FC. After an impressive display at Barrolle he was signed by Liberian club Barrack Young Controllers FC. Sherman spent a season with them and later moved to Sweden to join Harnosand FC. Cyprus League side Cetinkaya TSK then signed him for the 2012–13 season. After a good season, he joined Lefke Türk S.K. and later moved to Young Africans S.C. in the Tanzania League. He became one of the club's top forwards.

After winning the 2014–15 Tanzanian Premier League, Mpumalanga Black Aces F.C. signed him to a three-year contract, and he made his debut in a match against Orlando Pirates on 8 September 2015.

Northern Cyprus

Sherman Moved to Cetinkaya TSK in 2012.
He was said to have been in phenomenal form in the KTFF Süper Lig, scoring 8 goals with Cetinkaya TSK by February 2013 and was among top scorers. Instrumental to Cetinkaya TSK's 2012–13 title, he won the 2014–15 Tanzanian Premier League after transferring to Young Africans S.C., making him the first Liberian to win league titles in two different countries.

South Africa

Sherman transferred to Mpumalanga Black Aces F.C. in 2015.

When the first half of the 2015-16 National First Division was over, Mpumalanga Black Aces F.C. loaned him to Santos Engen in the winter transfer window.
Santos Engen chief director Zeca Marques commended the Liberian international as "arguably one of the best players we ever signed."

Malaysia

In 2017, Sherman signed for MISC-MIFA. He scored his first goal for them in a 3–3 draw with UiTM F.C. and scored 6 goals by the end of September, finishing the season with 7 goals and 3 assists in 9 appearances, helping MISC-MIFA avoid relegation and extending his contract for the 2018 season. On 7 December 2018, Sherman signed for Malaysia Super League club PKNS. He helped PKNS FC retain its spot in Malaysian Super League by scoring 14 goals in 19 games. He went on to finish the 2019 season as the Super League Golden Boot winner. On 27 November 2019, Sherman joined Malaysia Super League club Kedah FA.

Career statistics

Club

International career
Sherman made his international debut in an Africa Cup of Nations qualifying match against Lesotho on 30 May 2014.

International goals
Scores and results list Liberia's goal tally first.

Honors

 Young Africans S.C.
 Tanzanian Premier League 2014-15

 Çetinkaya TSK
 KTFF Super Lig 2012-13
Individual
PFAM Player of the Month: April 2021
Malaysia Super League: Top scorer 2019

References

External links
 
 
 AllAfrica.com

1992 births
Living people
Sportspeople from Monrovia
Liberian footballers
Association football forwards
Association football wingers
Barrack Young Controllers FC players
Young Africans S.C. players
Mpumalanga Black Aces F.C. players
Santos F.C. (South Africa) players
MISC-MIFA players
PKNS F.C. players
Kedah Darul Aman F.C. players
Liberia international footballers
Cypriot First Division players
Malaysia Premier League players
Liberian expatriate footballers
Expatriate footballers in Sweden
Expatriate footballers in Northern Cyprus
Expatriate footballers in Tanzania
Expatriate soccer players in South Africa
Expatriate footballers in Malaysia
Liberian expatriate sportspeople in Sweden
Liberian expatriate sportspeople in Northern Cyprus
Liberian expatriate sportspeople in Tanzania
Liberian expatriate sportspeople in South Africa
Liberian expatriate sportspeople in Malaysia
Tanzanian Premier League players